Led Zeppelin were an English rock band who were active from 1968 to 1980. They are widely considered to be one of the most powerful, innovative, successful, and influential bands in the history of popular music. Led Zeppelin have sold over 300 million records worldwide, including 111.5 million certified units in the United States, making them one of the world's best-selling music artists in history, as well as the second best selling band of all time in the United States.

American Music Awards
The American Music Awards are awarded annually by a poll of music buyers. Led Zeppelin was honoured with the "International Artist Award" in January 1995.

!
|-
| style="text-align:center;"|1995
| Led Zeppelin
| International Artist Award
| 
| style="text-align:center;"|
|-

Classic Rock Roll of Honour Awards
Classic Rock Roll of Honour Awards are presented annually by Classic Rock magazine. In November 2008, Led Zeppelin won "Event of the Year" for their 2007 reunion show. In 2013, they won "Film of the Year" for Celebration Day. In 2014, they won "Reissue of the Year" for the deluxe editions of their first three albums (Led Zeppelin I, II, and III).

|-
| style="text-align:center;"|2008
| Ahmet Ertegun Tribute Concert
| Event of the Year
| 
|-
| style="text-align:center;"|2013
| Celebration Day
| Film of the Year 
| 
|-
| style="text-align:center;"|2014
| Led Zeppelin I, II, & III Deluxe Edition
| Reissue of the Year
| 
|-

GQ Men Of The Year Awards
The GQ Men Of The Year Awards are presented annually by Gentlemen's Quarterly magazine. Led Zeppelin were honoured with the "Outstanding Achievement Award" in 2008.

|-
| style="text-align:center;"|2008
| Led Zeppelin
| Outstanding Achievement Award
| 
|-

Grammy Awards
The Grammy Awards are awarded annually by the National Academy of Recording Arts and Sciences in the United States. Led Zeppelin received a Grammy Lifetime Achievement Award in 2005. During their tenure as a band, their albums Led Zeppelin II, Houses of the Holy, Physical Graffiti, Presence, and In Through the Out Door each received nominations for Best Recording Package. Led Zeppelin had also received a nomination for Best New Artist in 1969, but they lost to Crosby, Stills & Nash. Led Zeppelin IV, "Stairway to Heaven", Led Zeppelin and "Whole Lotta Love" were inducted into the Grammy Hall of Fame in 1999, 2003, 2004 and 2007 respectively.

!
|-
| rowspan="1" align="center"| 1970
| Led Zeppelin
| Best New Artist
|
|
|-
|align="center" rowspan=2|2014
| "Kashmir"
| Best Rock Performance
|
|align="center" rowspan=2|
|-
| Celebration Day
| Best Rock Album
|
|-

Ivor Novello Awards
The Ivor Novello Awards are presented annually in London by the British Academy of Songwriters, Composers and Authors. Led Zeppelin were awarded an Ivor Novello Award for "Outstanding Contribution to British Music" on 12 May 1977. The band also received a "Liftetime Achievement Award" at the 42nd Annual Ivor Novello Awards in May 1997.

|-
| style="text-align:center;"|1977
| Led Zeppelin
| Ivor Novello Award
| 
|-
| style="text-align:center;"|1997
| Led Zeppelin
| Liftetime Achievement Award
| 
|-

Kennedy Center honors

In December 2012, US President Barack Obama honored Led Zeppelin by awarding the band with the US's highest cultural award, the Kennedy Center Honors.

Melody Maker Awards
The Melody Maker Awards were presented by the England's oldest music magazine Melody Maker. Led Zeppelin were honoured with several Melody Maker Awards in 1970, 1975 and 1979.

MOJO Awards

The MOJO Awards (or Mojo Honours Lists) is an awards ceremony that began in 2004 by Mojo, a popular music magazine published monthly by Bauer in the United Kingdom. Led Zeppelin received a MOJO Award in 2008 for the "best live act", as voted by the readers.

NME Awards
The New Musical Express (better known as the NME) hosts the Shockwaves NME Awards and "NME Pop Poll". Led Zeppelin topped the readers poll for consecutive three years (1974–76) under the category of the best "Vocal Group". In 2008, Led Zeppelin got a Shockwaves NME Awards nomination under the category of the "Best Music DVD" for The Song Remains the Same.

Polar Music Prize
The Polar Music Prize was founded in 1989 by Stig Anderson. Led Zeppelin received the honour in 2006.

Q Awards
The Q Awards are the UK's annual music awards run by the music magazine Q. Led Zeppelin have received a "Q Merit Award" in 1992.

Radio Music Awards
The Radio Music Awards was an annual U.S. award show that honours the year's most successful songs on mainstream radio. Led Zeppelin were nominated for "Artist of the Year/Rock Radio" in 2005.

Surround Music Awards
Led Zeppelin were named as "Surround Artist of the Year" at the second annual Surround Music Awards in 2003. The awards ceremony was hosted by Grammy Award winners Ed Cherney and Al Schmitt.

UK Music Video Awards

The UK Music Video Awards is an annual award ceremony founded in 2008 to recognise creativity, technical excellence and innovation in music videos and moving images for music.

!
|-
| style="text-align:center;"|2013
| Celebration Day
| Best Live Music Coverage
| 
| style="text-align:center;"|

Inductions

Rock and Roll Hall of Fame

Led Zeppelin were inducted into the Rock and Roll Hall of Fame on 12 January 1995.

UK Music Hall of Fame

Led Zeppelin were inducted into the UK Music Hall of Fame on 14 November 2006.

Mojo Hall of Fame 100

Led Zeppelin were inducted into the Mojo Hall of Fame 100 in November 2003.

References

Awards
Lists of awards received by British musician
Lists of awards received by musical group